Mõtsu is a village in Lääneranna Parish, Pärnu County, in southwestern Estonia. It has a population of 33 (as of 1 January 2011).

References

Villages in Pärnu County